Miguel is a Spanish and Portuguese surname. It is common in Spain, Portugal, The Philippines, and Latin America. It is related to the given name Michael.

Notable people with last name Miguel
 Amanda Miguel (born 1956), Argentine singer
 Ana Victoria (born 1983), American singer
 Ángel Miguel (1929-2009), Spanish golfer
 Aurelio Miguel (born 1964), Brazilian judoka and politician
 Edward Miguel (born 1974), American economist
 Florian Miguel (born 1996), French soccer player
 Girlyn Miguel (born 1948), Vincentian politician
 Jose Miguel (born 1969), Argentine goalkeeper and soccer player
 Lorenzo Miguel (1927–2002), Argentine labor activist
 Luna Miguel Santos (born 1990), Spanish writer
 Macarena Miguel (born 1995), Mexican singer, actress, and engineer
 Marta Pérez Miguel (born 1994), Spanish athlete
 Mónica Miguel (1936–2020), Mexican actress
 Muriel Miguel (born 1937), Native American theatre director and choreographer
 Nigel Miguel (born 1963), Belizean actor, film commissioner and basketball player
 Tomas Rochez (born 1964), Honduran soccer player
 Whitney Miguel (born 1991), Angolan basketball players